Ostrum may refer to:

 Östrum, a village in the southern part of Bad Salzdetfurth in Lower Saxony, Germany
 Ostrum (dragon), a fictional dragon in Dragonaut: The Resonance
 Peter Ostrum (born 1957),  American large animal veterinarian and former child actor
 Ostrum Asset Management, a France-based asset manager

See also
 Ostrom (disambiguation)
 Oestrum (disambiguation)